Galina Ganeker (born 10 April 1917, date of death unknown) was an Azerbaijani athlete. She competed in the women's high jump at the 1952 Summer Olympics, representing the Soviet Union.

References

External links
 

1917 births
Year of death missing
Athletes (track and field) at the 1952 Summer Olympics
Azerbaijani female high jumpers
Soviet female high jumpers
Olympic athletes of the Soviet Union
Sportspeople from Baku